Saman Sorjaturong (born Saman Sriprated on 2 August 1968 in Amphoe Khlong Lan, Kamphaeng Phet province) is a Thai former world boxing champion.

Early life
He was born in a peasant family in Kamphaeng Phet province, upper central Thailand, with four siblings. In childhood, he did not live with his parents because they had moved to another village. As a child, Saman was ordained a novice and went to live at the temple with his grandfather who was ordained monk. He stayed there until graduated sixth grade.

Later on, he went to Bangkok to study Buddhism for five years in Wat Pho, until graduating with level three in Buddhist Theology, which can be called "Maha" (serious) prefix.

Boxing career
Saman turned pro at the age of 21, with a love for professional boxing, having written a letter to ask for help from Mom Rajawongse (M.R.)  Naris Kridakorn,  editor of World Boxing Magazine.  M.R. Naris had recommended him to the "Sorjaturong Boxing Gym" (ค่ายมวย ส.จาตุรงค์)  by Suchart Theerawuttichuwong as owner and trainer.

Saman won the WBC, IBF and lineal junior flyweight titles during his career. He is the third Thai world boxing champion not to be previously involved in Muaythai (the first being Pone Kingpetch, and the second being Chartchai Chionoi). Saman was also the first Thai and Asian boxer who won world championships of two institutions at the same time. Before that, he was criticized for not being capable enough to be a world champion. In 1993 he challenged the WBC strawweight world champion with Ricardo López, but was defeated in the second round. He defeated reigning champion Humberto González in a thrilling fight that was named Ring Magazine's Fight of the Year in 1995 to win the IBF and WBC titles. Both fighters were knocked down twice during the fight. He defended the WBC portion of the title ten times before losing it to Yo Sam Choi in 1999 via a unanimous decision. Their rematch was postponed seven times, finally taking place in 2001, when Saman lost by a knockout in the seventh round. He retired in 2005 after being knocked out in the first round by Kōki Kameda.

Life after boxing
After retirement, he opened a Khao man kai (Thai version of Hainanese chicken rice) and  Khao mu daeng (rice with red pork)  restaurant in his home town of Ban Fah Lagoon Village, Rangsit, Pathumthani province.

Professional boxing record

See also 
List of light flyweight boxing champions
List of WBC world champions
List of IBF world champions

References

External links 
 
Saman Sorjaturong - CBZ Profile
- Saman Sorjaturong
http://www.sportenote.com/vedi_dettagli.asp?id=47289

|-

|-

|-

1969 births
International Boxing Federation champions
Living people
World Boxing Council champions
World light-flyweight boxing champions
World boxing champions
Saman Sorjaturong
Saman Sorjaturong